James Rollo may refer to:

Jim Rollo (1937–2012), Scottish professional footballer
Jimmy Rollo (born 1976), English professional footballer
James Rollo, 2nd Lord Rollo (1600–1669), Scottish aristocrat
James Rollo, 7th Lord Rollo (1738–1784), Scottish aristocrat